Rangueil (Languedocien: Ranguèlh) is a residential area south-east of Toulouse in Haute-Garonne, France, where grandes écoles and Universities are located as well as an important scientific complex.

Schools
 École nationale de l'aviation civile (ENAC)
 Paul Sabatier University (UPS)
 University Institutes of Technology

Sciences Institutions 
 CNES (National Centre for Space Studies, French: Centre national d'études spatiales)
 Centre national de la recherche scientifique (CNRS)
 Institut de recherche en informatique de Toulouse (IRIT-CNRS)
 Laboratory for Analysis and Architecture of Systems (LAAS-CNRS)
 Institut de Formation en Soins Infirmiers (IFSI)
 Institut national des sciences appliquées de Toulouse (INSA)
 Institut supérieur de l'aéronautique et de l'espace (ISAE)
 Institut de Mathématiques de Toulouse (IMT)
 Observatoire Midi-Pyrénées (OMP)

Hospitals
 Rangueil Hospital

Transport 
Toulouse Metro Line B Rangueil station.

See also 
 Ramonville-Saint-Agne

References 

Education in Toulouse
Toulouse
Neighbourhoods in France